Piotr Czaczka (born 15 January 1958) is a former Polish handball player who competed in the 1980 Summer Olympics and finished seventh with the Polish team.

References

External links
Profile  

1958 births
Living people
People from Opole County
Sportspeople from Opole Voivodeship
Polish male handball players
Handball players at the 1980 Summer Olympics
Olympic handball players of Poland
20th-century Polish people